Bad Day at Black Rock is a 1955 American neo-Western film directed by John Sturges with screenplay by Millard Kaufman. It stars Spencer Tracy and Robert Ryan with support from Anne Francis, Dean Jagger, Walter Brennan, John Ericson, Ernest Borgnine and Lee Marvin. The film is a crime drama set in 1945 that contains elements of the revisionist Western genre. In the plot, a one-armed stranger (Tracy) comes to a small desert town and uncovers an evil secret that has corrupted the entire community.

The film was based on a short story called "Bad Time at Honda" by Howard Breslin, published by The American Magazine in January 1947. Filming began in July 1954 and the movie went on national release in January 1955. It was a box office success and was nominated for three Academy Awards in 1956. In 2018, it was selected for preservation in the United States National Film Registry by the Library of Congress as being "culturally, historically, or aesthetically significant".

Plot

In late 1945, one-armed John J. Macreedy gets off a train at the isolated Californian desert hamlet of Black Rock. The residents immediately appear suspicious, as this is the first time in four years that the train has stopped there. After Macreedy states he is looking for a man named Komoko, several of the local men become hostile. Hastings, the telegraph agent, tells him there are no cabs. The hotel desk clerk, Pete Wirth, claims he has no vacant rooms. Hector David threatens him. Later, Reno Smith informs Macreedy that Komoko, a Japanese-American, was interned during World War II.

Macreedy visits the local sheriff, Tim Horn, but the alcoholic lawman is of no help. The veterinarian and undertaker, Doc Velie, advises Macreedy to leave town immediately, but lets slip that Komoko is dead. Pete's sister Liz rents Macreedy a Jeep. He drives to nearby Adobe Flat, where he finds a homestead burned to the ground, and wildflowers growing nearby. As Macreedy drives back, Coley Trimble tries to run him off the road. Macreedy tries to leave town, but Liz, having been confronted by Smith earlier, refuses to rent him the Jeep again. When Smith asks about his lost left arm, Macreedy discloses that he lost it fighting in Italy. Macreedy says the wildflowers at the Komoko place lead him to suspect that a body is buried there. Smith reveals that he is virulently anti-Japanese; he tried to enlist the day after the attack on Pearl Harbor, but failed the physical.

Macreedy tries to telephone the state police, but Pete refuses to put the call through. Doc Velie admits that something terrible happened four years ago, but Smith has everyone too terrified to speak up. Velie offers Macreedy his old hearse to leave town, but Hector disables it. Macreedy writes a telegram to the state police and gives it to Hastings. Macreedy goes to the diner where Trimble provokes a fight with him but Macreedy, though disabled, easily beats him up by using martial arts. Macreedy confronts Smith and accuses him of killing Komoko with the help of others. Hastings arrives and tries to give Smith a piece of paper, but Macreedy snatches it away. It is his unsent telegram. Macreedy and Velie tell Hastings he has broken the law and demand that Horn take action. Horn stands up to arrest Hastings, but Smith pulls the sheriff's badge off Horn's shirt and pins it on Hector, who casually tears up the telegram.

After Smith and Hector leave, Macreedy reveals that the loss of his arm had left him wallowing in self-pity, but Trimble's attempt to kill him has reinvigorated him. Macreedy finally reveals that Komoko's son died in combat (with the 442nd Infantry Regiment) while saving his life. Macreedy came to town intending to give the man's medal to Komoko. Macreedy learns that the elder Komoko had leased some farmland from Smith, who was sure there was no water. Komoko dug a well and found water. After Smith was rejected for military service, he and the other men got to drinking, then decided to scare Komoko. The old man barricaded himself inside his home, but the men set it on fire. When Komoko emerged ablaze, Smith shot and killed him.

Doc and Pete enlist Liz to help Macreedy escape under cover of darkness. Hector is standing guard outside the hotel; Pete lures him into the office, where Doc Velie knocks him unconscious. Liz drives Macreedy out of town, but stops at Adobe Flat. Macreedy realizes he has been set up. When Smith starts shooting at him, Macreedy shelters behind the Jeep. Liz rushes to Smith despite Macreedy's warning. Smith tells her that she has to die along with the rest of his accomplices. Smith shoots her in the back as she flees. Macreedy finds a bottle and fills it with gas from the Jeep. When Smith climbs down for a better shot, Macreedy throws the Molotov cocktail, setting Smith on fire. Macreedy drives back to town with Smith's and Liz's bodies. The state police are called in and several arrests are made. As Macreedy is leaving town, Doc Velie requests Komoko's medal to help Black Rock heal. Macreedy gives it to him just before boarding the train.

Cast

The small cast included three past and two future Academy Award winners; one past Academy Award nominee; and one future Golden Globe winner. Brennan (1936, 1938, 1940), Jagger (1950) and Tracy (1938, 1939) had all won Academy Awards. Ryan (1948) had been nominated for one. In later years, Borgnine (1956) and Marvin (1965) both won Academy Awards; and Francis (1965) won a Golden Globe.

Production

Bad Day at Black Rock originated as a short story by Howard Breslin with full-color illustrations by Robert Fawcett. Entitled "Bad Time at Honda", it was published by The American Magazine in January 1947. It was adapted into a script by Don McGuire and pitched to MGM production head Dore Schary, who was known for championing films that addressed social problems. Schary had previously produced Go for Broke! (1951), based on the exploits of the segregated Japanese-American 442nd Regimental Combat Team. Breslin novelised the script, using the pseudonym Michael Niall. His book was published in 1954 by Fawcett Publications.

Schary acquired the film rights for MGM, but he brought in Millard Kaufman to rewrite McGuire's script. The producers were worried about the title because "Bad Time at Honda" was similar to Hondo, recently made by John Wayne. Kaufman suggested changing the name of the town to Black Rock, after a real town in Arizona. Kaufman finished the script in the fall of 1953. Although Spencer Tracy was 55 and much older than the platoon leader in the original story, Schary wanted Tracy to play the lead role. John Sturges was hired as director in June 1954 and shooting began the following month near Lone Pine, California, where the small town set had been quickly constructed. Just before shooting began, an indecisive Tracy tried to back out of the picture. Schary made clear that he was willing to sue the actor if he quit the film. Budget for the film was $1.3 million and it was shot in color using Cinemascope as Schary thought widescreen would emphasise the menace of the isolated town. On August 9, the cast and crew moved to the studio lot in Culver City. André Previn was hired to write the score.

While the film is essentially a crime drama set in 1945, it is recognised as a neo-Western with strong links to the revisionist Western genre. The premiere was at Loew's 72nd Street Theater in New York City on December 8, 1954. The film went on national release in January 1955. According to MGM records, it earned US$1,966,000 in the US and Canada and $1,822,000 elsewhere, making the studio a profit of $947,000.

Themes
Though essentially a crime drama with revisionist Western overtones, the film is one of the first to recognise discrimination against Japanese Americans in World War II. No Japanese American characters are portrayed, though Komoko and his son, both dead, are central to the plot. In her 1991 documentary film, History and Memory: For Akiko and Takashige, Rea Tajiri uses footage from  Bad Day at Black Rock to illustrate prevailing attitudes towards the Japanese. Tajiri's family were among those interned after the Attack on Pearl Harbor.

John Streamas describes the film as an indictment of both racism and McCarthyism. He comments on the unusual means of denunciation that it employs because, with no Japanese American characters taking part, there is no liberation of an oppressed victim. Instead, the film delivers justice for the victim of a murder that took place four years earlier.

Reception

Critical response
When Bad Day at Black Rock was released, the reviews were almost universally positive with, for example, John O'Hara in Collier's hailing it as "one of the finest motion pictures ever made". Many reviewers noted the film's Western-like elements, comparing it favorably with High Noon and cinematographer William C. Mellor was widely praised for his use of widescreen. Film critic Bosley Crowther of the New York Times wrote: "Slowly, through a process of guarded discourse, which director John Sturges has built up by patient, methodical pacing, an eerie light begins to glimmer". At the end of 1955, the New York Times included the film in its best ten of the year.

Despite a storyline she called "crudely melodramatic", Pauline Kael heaped praise on the film for its direction and cinematography, calling it "a very superior example of motion picture craftsmanship". Variety magazine's reviewer wrote: "Considerable excitement is whipped up in this suspense drama, and fans who go for tight action will find it entirely satisfactory. Besides telling a yarn of tense suspense, the picture is concerned with a social message on civic complacency".

Accolades

Notes

References

Bibliography

External links

 
 
 
 
 
 Bad Day at Black Rock informational site and DVD review at DVD Beaver (includes images)
 
 "Bad Day at Black Rock" from Densho Encyclopedia, Brian Niiya

1955 films
1955 Western (genre) films
American Western (genre) films
Neo-Western films
1950s crime thriller films
1950s mystery films
1950s psychological thriller films
American mystery films
American psychological thriller films
CinemaScope films
Films scored by André Previn

Films about racism
Films about veterans
Films based on short fiction
Films directed by John Sturges
Films set in 1945
Films set in California
Films shot in Lone Pine, California
Metro-Goldwyn-Mayer films
United States National Film Registry films
1950s English-language films
1950s American films